2019 ACC tournament may refer to:

 2019 ACC men's basketball tournament
 2019 ACC women's basketball tournament
 2019 ACC men's soccer tournament
 2019 ACC women's soccer tournament
 2019 Atlantic Coast Conference baseball tournament
 2019 Atlantic Coast Conference softball tournament